The Armstrong Breech Loading 20-pounder gun, later known as RBL 20-pounder, was an early modern 3.75-inch rifled breech-loading light gun of 1859.

History 
The gun was effectively a larger version of the successful RBL 12 pounder 8 cwt Armstrong gun. There were different versions for land and sea service.

Sea service 

The RBL 20 pounder of 13 cwt and 15 cwt for sea service was introduced in 1859. It is 2½ feet shorter than the land version giving it a bore of only 54 inches (14.43 calibres), and hence a short stubby appearance. Its short barrel only allowed it to attain a muzzle velocity of 1,000 ft/second.

The 15 cwt gun, identifiable by the raised coil in front of the vent slot, was intended for broadside use in sloops. The more lightly constructed 13 cwt gun was known as a pinnace gun and was intended for boat use.

Land service 
The RBL 20 pounder of 16 cwt for land service was introduced in 1860. It has a bore of 84 inches (22.36 calibres) and hence has the appearance of a typical field gun. After it became obsolete for regular Royal Artillery use, a small number were re-issued to Volunteer Artillery Batteries of Position from 1889, alongside 16-pounder RML guns and 40 Pounder RBL guns. The 1893 the War Office Mobilisation Scheme shows the allocation of twelve Artillery Volunteer position batteries equipped with 20 Pounder guns which would be concentrated in Epping, Essex in the event of mobilisation.

Surviving examples 
 An unrestored 13 cwt pinnace gun at Hong Kong Museum of Coastal Defence
 A 16 cwt gun on board HMS Warrior at Portsmouth, UK
 A 13 cwt gun dated 1859 at the Artillery Museum, North Head, Sydney, Australia
 Sea Service Pattern at Explosion! Museum of Naval Firepower, Gosport

See also 
 Armstrong gun
 List of field guns
 List of naval guns

Notes

References

Bibliography 
 Treatise on the construction and manufacture of ordnance in the British service. War Office, UK, 1877
 Text Book of Gunnery, 1887. London : Printed for his Majesty's Stationery Office, by Harrison and Sons, St. Martin's Lane 
 Alexander Lyman Holley, A treatise on Ordnance and Armor published by D Van Nostrand, New York, 1865
 Lieutenant-Colonel C H Owen R.A., The principles and practice of modern artillery, published by John Murray, London, 1873

External links 

 Handbook for the 20-pr. R.B.L. gun of 16-cwt. on garrison sliding carriage and on travelling carriage, 1892, 1896

Artillery of the United Kingdom
Field guns
Naval guns of the United Kingdom
Elswick Ordnance Company
95 mm artillery
Victorian-era weapons of the United Kingdom